Demopsestis formosana is a moth in the family Drepanidae. It was described by Yoshimoto in 1983. It is found in Taiwan.

References

Moths described in 1983
Thyatirinae